This is a list of former high school athletic conferences in the East and Southeast Regions of Ohio, as designated by the OHSAA. If a conference had members that span multiple regions, the conference is placed in the article of the region most of its former members hail from. Because the names of localities and their corresponding high schools do not always match and because there is often a possibility of ambiguity with respect to either the name of a locality or the name of a high school, the following table gives both in every case, with the locality name first, in plain type, and the high school name second in boldface type. The school's team nickname is given last.

Adams County League
The ACL was one of the local small-school county leagues in Southwest Ohio. Consolidation reduced the number of teams to five by 1964, and in 1970 these five joined with the Brown and Highland county leagues to form the Southern Hills Athletic League.
 Blue Creek Bluejays (1930s-64, consolidated into West Union)
 Locust Grove Franklin Township Panthers (1930s-64, consolidated into Peebles)
 Jefferson Eagles (1930s-70, to Southern Hills)
 Manchester Greyhounds1 (1930s-70, to Tri-County)
 Seaman North Adams Green Devils (1964–70, to Southern Hills)
 Peebles Indians1 (1930s-70, to Tri-County)
 Seaman Green Devils (1930s-64, consolidated into North Adams)
 Cherry Fork Wayne Township Falcons (1930s-64, consolidated into North Adams)
 West Union Dragons (1930s-70, to Southern Hills)
 Winchester Rifles (1930s-64, consolidated into North Adams)

 Manchester and Peebles played concurrently in the ACL and Tri-County League 1964-70.

Athens County League
 Albany Red Devils (192?-66, consolidated into Alexander)
 Amesville Ames-Bern Greenies (192?-69, consolidated into Federal Hocking)
 Buchtel-York Bruins (192?-67, consolidated into Nelsonville-York)
 Coolville Carthage-Troy Trojans (192?-67, consolidated into Federal Hocking)
 Chauncey-Dover Blue Devils (192?-46, to Southeastern Ohio Buckeye League, 1965-67, consolidated into Athens)
 Glouster Tomcats (192?-30, to Muskingum Valley League, 1965–69, to Mid-Ohio Valley Conference)1
 Jacksonville-Trimble Cardinals (192?-46, to SEOBL)
 Guysville Rome-Canaan Spartans (192?-67, consolidated into Federal Hocking)
 Shade Panthers (192?-66, consolidated into Alexander)
 The Plains Indians (192?-46, to SEOBL, 1965-67, consolidated into Athens)
 New Marshfield Waterloo Rockets (192?-66, consolidated into Alexander)
 Carbon Hill Bulldogs (1962–67, consolidated into Nelsonville-York)
 Murray City Miners (1962–67, consolidated into Nelsonville-York)
 Albany Alexander Spartans (1966–69, to MOVC)1
 Stewart Federal Hocking Lancers (1967–69, to Tri-Valley Conference)

 Concurrent with MOVC 1965-69 (or 1966-69 for Alexander).

Belmont County League
"A" Division
 Barnesville Shamrocks (192?-59, to Ohio Valley Athletic Conference)4
 Bellaire Big Reds (192?-59, to OVAC)1
 Bridgeport Mustangs (192?-59, to OVAC)2
 Martins Ferry Purple Riders (192?-59, to OVAC)1
 St. Clairsville Red Devils (192?-59, to OVAC)3
 Shadyside Tigers (192?-59, to OVAC)1
"B" Division
 Belmont Eagles (192?-59, consolidated into Union Local)
 Bethesda Bulldogs (192?-59, consolidated into Union Local)
 Centerville Cougars (192?-59, consolidated into Union Local)
 Flushing Falcons (192?-59, consolidated into Union Local)
 Holloway Railroaders (192?-59, consolidated into Union Local)
 Lafferty Lions (192?-59, consolidated into Union Local)
 Powhattan Point Indians (192?-54, consolidated into River)1
 Randolph Rangers (192?-59, consolidated into Union Local)
 Bellaire St. John Central Irish (192?-59, to OVAC)1
 Martins Ferry St. Mary's Saints (192?-55, consolidated into St. John Central)
 Lafferty Seton Central Saints (192?-59, to OVAC)

 Concurrent with OVAC 1943-59.
 Concurrent with OVAC 1946-59.
 Concurrent with OVAC 1947-59.
 Concurrent with OVAC 1953-59.

Buckeye Border Conference (East)
This was a conference located in far eastern Ohio, with many schools who maintained membership in the Ohio Valley Athletic Conference. This conference should not be confused with the Northwest Ohio league of the same name.
 Lisbon Beaver Fighting Beavers (1961-74, to Tri-County Conference (Northeast))
 Carrollton Warriors (1961-74, to Senate League)
 Richmond Jefferson Union Yellow Jackets (1961-74, to Ohio Valley Athletic Conference)
 Shadyside Tigers (1961-74, to OVAC)1
 Smithfield Spartans (1961-72, consolidated into Buckeye North)1
 Salineville Southern Indians (1961-74, to TCC)
 Steubenville Central Catholic Crusaders (1961-74, to OVAC)1
 Toronto Red Knights (1961-74, to TCC)
 Wellsville Tigers (1961-74, to TCC)2
 Hanoverton United Eagles (1964-72, to TCC)
 Hammondsville Stanton Red Raiders (1968-74, to TCC)1

 Concurrent with OVAC throughout tenure in conference.
 Concurrent with OVAC 1973-74.

Cardinal Conference

 Ashland Arrows (1960–1987, to Ohio Heartland)
 Dover Tornadoes (1960–1987, to Northeastern Buckeye in 1989)
 Mansfield Madison Rams (1960–1987, to Ohio Heartland)
 Wooster Generals (1960–1987, to Federal)
 Coshocton Redskins (1961–1987, to East Central Ohio)
 Mansfield Malabar Falcons (1961–1981, consolidated into Mansfield)
 New Philadelphia Quakers (1961–1987, to Federal)

Note: The Ohio Cardinal Conference was created in 2003 to preserve the legacy of the former Cardinal Conference.

Carroll County League
One of the smallest county conferences, the CCL lasted until two of its members consolidated in 1962, while the other two schools had been playing in other leagues concurrently with the CCL.

 Augusta Blue Devils (192?-62, consolidated into Carrollton)
 Dellroy Blue Jets (192?-62, consolidated into Carrollton)
 Malvern Hornets1 (192?-62, to Tuscarawas Valley Athletic Conference)
 Sherrodsville Wildcats (192?-56, consolidated into Conotton Valley)
 Bowerston2 Conotton Valley Rockets3 (1956–62, to Harrison County League and Tuscarawas Valley Athletic Conference)

 Concurrent with TVAC 1960-62.
 Mailing address is Bowerston, in Harrison County, physical location is in Sherrodsville.
 Concurrent with HCL 1950-71, concurrent in HCL and TVAC (football conference only) 1960-66.

Coshocton County League
 Conesville Vikings (192?-61, consolidated into Three Rivers)
 Fresno Indians (192?-64, consolidated into Ridgewood)
 Keene Cardinals (192?-61, consolidated into Three Rivers)
 Plainfield Panthers (192?-64, consolidated into Ridgewood)
 Roscoe Tigers (192?-61, consolidated into Three Rivers)
 Coshocton Sacred Heart Hilltoppers (192?-38)
 Tunnel Hill Union Trojans (192?-65, consolidated into River View)
 Warsaw Pirates (192?-65, consolidated into River View)
 Roscoe Three Rivers Patriots1 (1961–65, consolidated into River View)

 Concurrent with Scenic Hills Athletic Conference 1964-65.

East Central Ohio League (old)
This early incarnation of the ECOL functioned mostly as a football league and secondary league for schools who also participated in local county leagues. The conference would never find its legs, as it spent its last eight years with only four members.

 Cadiz Cardinals (1949-52, to Harrison County League)1
 Carrollton Warriors (1949-60, to Buckeye Border Conference (East) 1961)
  Dennison Railroaders (1949-60, to Tuscarawas Valley Athletic Conference)2
 Newcomerstown Trojans (1949-60, to Tuscarawas County League)2
 Uhrichsville Tigers (1949-60, to TVAC)2

 Concurrent with HCL 1949-52.
 Concurrent with TCL 1949-60.

East Central Ohio League (new)

 Zanesville Bishop Rosecrans Bishops (2011-2017)
 Cambridge Bobcats (1987-2021)
 Uhrichsville Claymont Mustangs (1989-2016)
 Coshocton Redskins (1987-2020)
 Dover Tornadoes (1993-2022)
 Gnadenhutten Indian Valley Braves (1996-2007)
 Marietta Tigers (2011-2022)
 Byesville Meadowbrook Colts (1987-2020)
 New Philadelphia Quakers (1997-2022, leaving for Ohio Cardinal Conference)
 Warsaw River View Black Bears (2005-2020)
 St. Clairsville Red Devils (1987–1996)
 Vincent Warren Warriors (2020-2022)
 Zanesville Blue Devils (2011-2020)

Division alignments (2011-17)
 Gray: Bishop Rosecrans (2011-17), Claymont (2011-16), Coshocton, Meadowbrook, River View
 Scarlet: Cambridge, Dover, Marietta, New Philadelphia, Zanesville

Fairfield County League
This league had many members concurrently with the Mid-State League, and ended when Pickerington, the last remaining non-MSL member, joined the MSL in 1966.

 Amanda-Clearcreek Aces4 (Amanda Black Aces before 1960, 192?-66, to MSL)
 Carroll Bulldogs4 (192?-66, to MSL)
 Clearport Cougars (192?-35, consolidated into Amanda)
 Crawfis Rangers (192?-30, consolidated into Berne Union)
 Baltimore Liberty Union Lions1 (192?-66, to MSL)
 Millersport Lakers3 (192?-66, to MSL)
 Pickerington Tigers (192?-66, to MSL)
 Pleasantville Panthers (192?-57, consolidated into Fairfield Union)
 Bremen Rushcreek Memorial Oilers (192?-62, consolidated into Fairfield Union)
 Rushville Cardinals (192?-57, consolidated into Fairfield Union)
 Stoutsville Indians (192?-60, consolidated into Amanda-Clearcreek)
 Sugar Grove Bees (192?-30, consolidated into Berne Union)
 Thurston Red Devils (192?-60, consolidated into Liberty Union)
 Sugar Grove Berne Union Rockets2 (1930–66, to MSL)
 Rushville Fairfield Union Falcons3 (1957–66, to MSL)

 concurrent in FCL and MSL 1949-66.
 concurrent in FCL and MSL 1953-66.
 concurrent in FCL and MSL 1957-66.
 concurrent in FCL and MSL 1958-66.

Fayette County League
This small league contained all of the county schools outside of Washington Court House. New Holland, which sits on the border between Fayette and Pickaway Counties, played in the Pickaway County League until moving to the FCL in 1958 for its final two seasons.

 Bloomingburg Bulldogs (1930s-60, consolidated into Miami Trace)
 Jeffersonville Tigers (1930s-60, consolidated into Miami Trace)
 Madison Mills Warriors (Millers before 1950) (1930s-60, consolidated into Miami Trace)
 Good Hope Wayne Mad Anthonies (1930s-60, consolidated into Miami Trace)
 New Holland Bulldogs (1958–60, to Pickaway County League)

Guernsey County League
 Buffalo Bison (19??-64, consolidated into Meadowbrook)
 Byesville Falcons (19??-64, consolidated into Meadowbrook)
 Robins Community Bulldogs (19??-51, consolidated into Byesville)
 Cumberland Vikings (19??-64, consolidated into Meadowbrook)
 Lore City Bearcats (19??-60, consolidated into Madison)
 Antrim Madison Eagles (19??-77, consolidated into Buckeye Trail)
  Old Washington Cardinals (19??-67, consolidated into Zane Trace)
 Pleasant City Tigers (19??-64, consolidated into Meadowbrook)
 Quaker City Quakers (19??-67, consolidated into Zane Trace)
 Senecaville Indians (19??-60, consolidated into Pleasant City)
 Byesville Meadowbrook Colts (1964-77, to Ohio Valley Athletic Conference)1
 Old Washington Zane Trace Trojans (1967-77, consolidated into Buckeye Trail)

 Concurrent with OVAC 1972-77.

Harrison County League
 Bowerston Trojans (1929–56, consolidated into Conotton Valley)
 Cadiz Cardinals1 (192?-71, to Ohio Valley Athletic Conference)
 New Athens Franklin Bobcats (192?-71, consolidated into Cadiz)
 Hopedale Comets (192?-71, consolidated into Cadiz)
 Jewett Wildcats (192?-71, consolidated into Jewett-Scio)
 Freeport Lakeland Red Raiders (1929–99, Freeport Red Raiders before 1961-2, Harrison County League 1929-71, to Inter-Valley Conference 1974-99)
 Scio Panthers (192?-71, consolidated into Jewett-Scio)
 Bowerston Conotton Valley Rockets2 (1956–74)
 Jewett-Scio Vikings (1971–74, to Inter-Valley Conference 1974-99)

 Concurrent with OVAC 1956-99.
 Concurrent with Carroll County League 1956-62, and Tuscarawas Valley Athletic Conference 1960-68.

Highland County League
The HCL was one of the local small-school county leagues in Southwest Ohio. The league had eight schools for most of its history, but consolidation chipped away at its membership total. League membership had been reduced to three by 1969,and these teams struggled on for a year until the creation of the Southern Hills Athletic League, which saw the three combine with the Adams and Brown county leagues, who had five teams apiece at that point.
 Belfast Hornets (1924–69, consolidated into Whiteoak)
 Buford Bulldogs (1924–66, consolidated into Lynchburg-Clay)
 Leesburg Fairfield Lions (1924–70, to Southern Hills)
 Lynchburg-Clay Mustangs (1924–70, Lynchburg until 1966, to Southern Hills)
 Marshall Red Flashes (1924–60, consolidated into Hillsboro)
 Rainsboro Panthers (1924–68, consolidated into McClain)
 Sinking Spring Eagles (1924–68, consolidated into North Adams)
 Mowrystown Whiteoak Wildcats (1924–70, to Southern Hills)

Holmes County League
 Berlin Blue Jays (192?-58, consolidated into Hiland)
 Charm Clark Colts (192?-59, consolidated into Hiland)
 Killbuck Bucks (192?-64, consolidated into West Holmes
 Holmesville Polar Bears (192?-55, consolidated into Waynedale)
 Lakeville Panthers (192?-52, consolidated into Big Prairie-Lakeland)
 Millersburg Spartans (192?-64, consolidated into West Holmes)
 Nashville Tigers (192?-61, consolidated into Millersburg)
 Walnut Creek Cardinals (192?-58, consolidated into Hiland)
 Big Prairie-Lakeville Bulldogs (1937-64, Big Prairie before 1952, consolidated into West Holmes)
 Berlin Hiland Hawks (1958-64, to Inter-Valley Conference 1968)

Hocking County League
This was one of the few county leagues that folded while still having enough members for competition, as the four schools left for different leagues.

 Carbon Hill Bulldogs (192?-62, to Athens County League)
 Gibsonville Tigers (192?-60, consolidated into Logan)
 Haydensville Hawks (192?-34, consolidated into Logan)
 Ilesboro Eagles (192?-34, consolidated into Union Furnace)
 Laurelville Wildcats (192?-62, to Scioto Valley Conference)
 Murray City Miners (192?-62, to Athens County League)
 Rockbridge Red Raiders (192?-60, consolidated into Logan)
 South Bloomingville Dodgers (192?-60, consolidated into Logan)
 Union Furnace Warriors (192?-62, to Southern Valley Athletic League)

Jackson County League
 Bloomfield Falcons (192?-47, consolidated into Oak Hill)
 Coalton Vikings (192?-54, to Gallia County League)
 Oak Hill Oaks (192?-54, to Ohio Valley Conference)
 Petersburg Scioto Township Spartans (192?-54, consolidated into Jackson)
 Garfield Washington Township Warriors (192?-47, consolidated into Wellston)
 Wellston Golden Rockets1 (192?-54, to Southeast Ohio Athletic League)

 Concurrent with SEOAL 1925-54.

Lawrence County League
 Blackfork Bobcats (192?-47, consolidated into Oak Hill)
 Chesapeake Panthers (192?-48, to Southern Ohio Conference)
 Coal Grove Dawson-Bryant Hornets1 (192?-57, to Ohio Valley Conference)
 Vernon Decatur-Washington Warriors (192?-62, school closed 1964)
 Proctorville Fairland  Dragons (1949-57, to Ohio Valley Conference)
 Hanging Rock Rockets (192?-50, consolidated into Rock Hill)
 Kitts Hill Toppers (192?-50, consolidated into Rock Hill)
 Aid Mason-Aid Green Wave (192?-61, consolidated into Symmes Valley)
 Pedro Redmen (192?-50, consolidated into Rock Hill)
 Pedro Rock Hill Redmen1 (1950-57, to Ohio Valley Conference)
 Proctorville Red Raiders (192?-49, consolidated into Fairland)
 Rome Romans (1925-49, consolidated into Fairland)
 Ironton St. Joseph Central Flyers (192?-62, to Ohio Valley Conference)
 South Point Pointers1 (192?-57, to Ohio Valley Conference)
 Waterloo Wonders (192?-61, consolidated into Symmes Valley)
 Willow Wood Windsor Dukes (192?-61, consolidated into Symmes Valley)
 Willow Wood Symmes Valley Vikings (1961–62, to Ohio Valley Conference)

 Concurrent with OVC 1954-57.

Meigs County League
 Chester Raiders (192?-61, consolidated into Eastern)
 Harrisonville Northwestern Bulldogs (192?-67, Harrisonville before 1961, consolidated into Meigs)
  Tuppers Plains Olive-Orange Wildcats (192?-61, consolidated into Eastern)
 Rutland Red Devils (192?-67, consolidated into Meigs)1
 Racine Southern Tornadoes1, 2 (192?-67, Racine until 1961, to Southern Valley Athletic Conference)
 Reedsville Eastern Eagles1, 2 (1961–67, to SVAC)

 Concurrent with Mid-Ohio Valley Conference 1965-67.
 Concurrent with SVAC 1961-67.

Mid-Ohio Valley Conference
This short-lived bridge conference should not be confused with what would eventually become the Pioneer Valley League. While both leagues used the Mid-Ohio Valley name at the same time, this operated more in the Southeast Region, while the eventual PVL more closely aligned with the East Region. All schools in this conference were eventually members of the TVC by either joining after leaving the Mid-Ohio Valley Conference or by consolidating into a school that eventually joined. Glouster, McArthur, and Rutland all joined by consolidating into Trimble, Vinton County, and Meigs. All members are still currently in the TVC except Miller and Wahama, who both left following the 2019-2020 school year.
 Reedsville Eastern Eagles (1965-71, to Southern Valley Athletic Conference)1, 2
 Glouster Tomcats (1965-71, to TVC 1978 as Glouster Trimble)3
 McArthur Generals (1965-66, consolidated into Vinton County High School)4
 Rutland Red Devils (1965-67, consolidated into Meigs)1
 Racine Southern Tornadoes (1965-69, to SVAC)1, 2
 Mason (WV) Wahama White Buffaloes (1965-69; nickname now White Falcons)
 Albany Alexander Spartans (1966-71, to TVC 1973)3
 McArthur Vinton County Vikings (1966-69, to TVC)
 Corning Miller Falcons (1968-71, to TVC 1983)

 Concurrent with Meigs County League 1965-67.
 Concurrent with SVAC for entire duration in conference.
 Concurrent with Athens County League from joining MOVC until 1969.
 Concurrent with Vinton County League 1965-66.

Monroe County League
 Beallsville Blue Devils (192?-64, to Ohio Valley Athletic Conference)
 Marr Bethel Blackhawks (192?-58, consolidated into Skyvue)
 Clarington Rats (192?-54, consolidated into River)
 Graysville Giants (192?-58, consolidated into Skyvue)
 Hannibal Hornets (192?-54, consolidated into River)
 Laings Eagles (192?-54, consolidated into River)
 Lewisville Lions (192?-58, consolidated into Skyvue)
 Antioch Perry Panthers (192?-52, consolidated into Graysville)
 Rinard Mills Raiders (192?-52, consolidated into Graysville)
 Sardis Hawks (192?-54, consolidated into River)
 Stafford Spartans (192?-52, consolidated into Lewisville)
 Woodsfield Redskins (192?-64, to Ohio Valley Athletic Conference)
 Hannibal River Pilots1 (1954–64, to Ohio Valley Athletic Conference)
 Graysville Skyvue Golden Hawks (1958–64, to Frontier Valley Conference)

 Concurrent with OVAC 1958-64.

Morgan County League
 Chesterhill Blue Devils (19??-66, consolidated into Morgan)
 Deavertown Tigers (19??-66, consolidated into Morgan)
 Malta Reds (19??-31, consolidated into Malta-McConnellsville)
 McConnellsville Raiders (19??-30, to Muskingum Valley League)
 Mountville Panthers (19??-58, consolidated into Malta-McConnellsville)
 Pennville Dragons (19??-58, consolidated into Stockport)
 Reinersville Roosters (19??-58, consolidated into Malta-McConnellsville)
 Stockport Indians (19??-66, consolidated into Morgan)

Muskingum County League
 Adamsville Wildcats (192?-66, consolidated into Tri-Valley)
 Chandlersville Comets (Cavaliers before 1950) (192?-66, consolidated into Philo)
 Frazeysburg Red Raiders (192?-66, consolidated into Tri-Valley)
 Dresden Jefferson Jayhawks (192?-50, to Muskingum Valley League)
 South Zanesville Maysville Panthers1 (South Zanesville before 1957) (192?-66, to Muskingum Valley)
 New Concord Little Muskies (192?-30, to Muskingum Valley League)
 Duncan Falls Philo Electrics (192?-38, to Muskingum Valley League)
 Hopewell West Muskingum Tornadoes (Hopewell before 1962) (192?-66, to Muskingum Valley League)

 Concurrent with MCL and MVL 1963-66.

Noble County League
 Batesville Beavers (192?-63, consolidated into Shenandoah)
 Belle Valley Raiders (192?-63, consolidated into Shenandoah)
 Caldwell Redskins (192?-33, to Muskingum Valley League)
 Dexter City Southern Noble Wildcats (192?-64, Dexter City before 1956, consolidated into Caldwell)
 Three Forks Forest Grove Foresters (192?-55, consolidated into Belle Valley)
 Harriettsville Hawks (192?-64, consolidated into Skyvue)
 Sarahsville Red Devils (192?-63, consolidated into Shenandoah)
 Marion Summerfield Golden Gophers (192?-63, consolidated into Shenandoah)
 Sarahsville Shenandoah Zeps (1963-64, to Mid-Ohio Valley Conference 1966)

Ohio-Kentucky Athletic Conference
 Ashland (KY) Blazer Tomcats (1986–94)
 Cannonsburg (KY) Boyd County Lions (1986–94)
 Greenup (KY) Greenup County Musketeers (1986–94)
 Ironton Tigers (1986–94)
 Portsmouth Trojans (1986–94)
 Russell (KY) Red Devils (1986–94)

Perry County League
Originally a 12-school conference encompassing all Perry County schools, the league settled into a stable, nine school league as the independent schools moved to the Muskingum Valley League. This was abruptly changed in 1960, as consolidation dropped the number from nine to two new consolidated schools.

 Corning Railroaders (192?-61, consolidated into Miller)
 Crooksville Big Red (192?-30, to Muskingum Valley League)
 Glenford Golden Horde (192?-60, consolidated into Sheridan)
 Junction City Wildcats (192?-61, consolidated into New Lexington)
 McLuney Wildcats (192?-61, consolidated into Crooksville)
 Moxahala Bobcats (192?-61, consolidated into Miller)
 New Lexington Panthers (192?-30, to Muskingum Valley)
 New Straitsville Big Red (192?-60, consolidated into Shawnee-New Straitsville)
 Roseville Ramblers (192?-44, to Muskingum Valley League)
 Shawnee Shawnee-New Straitsville Indians (Shawnee before 1960) (192?-61, consolidated into Miller)
 Somerset Raiders (192?-60, consolidated into Sheridan)
 Thornville Rams (192?-60, consolidated into Sheridan)
 Thornville Sheridan Generals (1960–61, to Muskingum Valley League 1966)

Pickaway County League
Another of the old County leagues for smaller schools, the league suffered from the rapid consolidation of schools in Pickaway County in the early 1960s. The league went from eleven schools in 1959 to four in 1963, with those four consolidating that next year.
 Ashville-Harrison Broncos (pre-1935-62, Ashville before 1949, consolidated into Teays Valley)
 Derby Darby Trojans (pre-1935-64, consolidated into Westfall)
 Little Walnut Jackson Wildcats (pre-1935-64, consolidated into Westfall)
 Five Points Monroe Indians (pre-1935-60, consolidated into Logan Elm)
 New Holland Bulldogs (pre-1935-58, to Fayette County League, 1960–62, consolidated into Miami Trace)
 Atlanta Perry Cruisers (pre-1935-64, consolidated into Westfall)
 Haysville Pickaway Pirates (pre-1935-60, consolidated into Logan Elm)
 Tarlton Salt Creek Warriors (pre-1935-60, consolidated into Logan Elm)
 Commercial Point Scioto Buffaloes (pre-1935-62, consolidated into Teays Valley)
 South Bloomfield Spartans (pre-1935-49, consolidated into Ashville-Harrison)
 Ringgold Walnut Tigers (pre-1935-62, consolidated into Teays Valley)
 Stoutsville Washington Township Cardinals(?) (pre-1935-49, consolidated into Pickaway)
 Williamsport Deer (pre-1935-64, consolidated into Westfall)

Pioneer Valley Conference
The PVC originally formed in 1964 as the Frontier Valley Conference, then became the Mid-Ohio Valley Conference in 1966 to avoid confusion with the newly consolidated Frontier Local School District. The conference settled on its current moniker in 1976 before dissolving in 2019.

 Caldwell Redskins (1964-2019)
 Beverly Fort Frye Cadets (1964-2019)
 Lawrence Golden Eagles (1964–68, consolidated into Frontier)
 New Matamoras Bulldogs (1964–68, consolidated into Frontier)
 Newport Trojans (1964–68, consolidated into Frontier)
 Marietta St. Mary Central Catholic Irish (1964–65)
 Lower Salem Salem-Liberty Cardinals (1964–66, consolidated into Fort Frye)
 Graysville Skyvue Golden Hawks (1964–94, consolidated into Monroe Central)
 Waterford Wildcats (1964–97, left for Tri-Valley Conference)
 Sarahsville Shenandoah Zeps (1966-2019)
 New Matamoras Frontier Cougars (1968-2019, left for Mid-Ohio Valley League)
 Beallsville Blue Devils (1976-2005, left for River Valley Conference)
 Woodsfield Redskins (1976–94, consolidated into Monroe Central)
 Woodsfield Monroe Central Seminoles (1994-2019, left for Mid-Ohio Valley League)
 Lore City Buckeye Trail Warriors (1997-2017)
 Hannibal River Pilots (2005-2014)

River Valley Conference
This was a short-lived conference in the 1990s to help some Ohio Valley Athletic Conference teams with scheduling.

 Lisbon Beaver Beavers (1990–99)
 Rayland Buckeye Panthers (1990–99)
 East Liverpool Potters (1990–99)
 Hammondsville Edison North Wildcats (1990–93, consolidated into Edison)
 Richmond Edison Wildcats (1990–99, Edison South before 1993)
 New Cumberland (WV) Oak Glen Golden Bears (1990–99)
 Weirton (WV) Weir Red Raiders (1990–99)
 Wintersville Golden Warriors (1990–93, consolidated into Indian Creek)
 Wintersville Indian Creek Redskins (1993–99)

Ross County League
Another County League that folded despite having ample competition, the league ended when the remaining members who weren't already affiliated with the Scioto Valley League members joined that conference in 1975.
 Adelphi Eagles (192?-67, consolidated into Zane Trace)
 Frankfort Adena Warriors3 (Frankfort before 1965) (192?-31, to SEOAL, 1937-75, to Scioto Valley League)
 South Salem Buckskin Bucks (192?-65, consolidated into McClain)
 Centralia Bulldogs (192?-67, consolidated into Zane Trace)
 Clarksburg Wildcats (192?-65, consolidated into Adena)
 Huntington Township Huntington Huntsmen5 (192?-75, to Scioto Valley League)
 Kingston Redskins (192?-67, consolidated into Zane Trace)
 Londonderry Liberty Township Lions (192?-55, consolidated into Southeastern)
 Bainbridge Paint Valley Bearcats2 (Bainbridge before 1958) (192?-75, to Scioto Valley League)
 Richmond Dale Southeastern Panthers (Richmond Dale before 1955) (192?-75, to Scioto Valley League)
 Bourneville Twin Tigers (192?-58, consolidated into Paint Valley)
 Pleasant Valley Unioto Sherman Tanks1 (192?-74, to South Central Ohio League)
 Chillicothe Bishop FlagetPanthers (1958–75, to Scioto Valley League)
 Kingston Zane Trace Pioneers4 (1967–75, to Scioto Valley League)

 Concurrent with RCL and SVL 1962-74.
 Concurrent with RCL and SVL 1962-75.
 Concurrent with RCL and SVL 1968-75.
 Concurrent with RCL and SVL 1971-75.
 Concurrent with RCL and SVL 1972-75.

Scenic Hills Conference
A short-lived "bridge" conference for newly consolidated and larger schools until the Inter-Valley Conference was formed.

 Newcomerstown Trojans1 (1964–68, to Inter-Valley Conference)
 West Lafayette Ridgewood Generals1 (1964–68, to Inter-Valley Conference)
 Roscoe Three Rivers Patriots2 (1964–65, consolidated into River View)
 Millersburg West Holmes Knights (1964–68, to Chippewa Conference)
 Warsaw River View Black Bears (1965–68)

 Concurrent with Tuscarawas County League 1964-65, Tuscarawas Valley Athletic Conference 1965-68.
 Concurrent with Coshocton County League 1964-65.

Scioto County League
The conference ended in 1979 as the non-Southern Ohio Conference affiliated members, who maintained affiliation with the Tri-County League, moved to the SOC while keeping TCL ties intact.
 Franklin Furnace Green Bobcats5 (192?-79, to Southern Ohio)
 Minford Falcons2 (192?-79, to Southern Ohio)
 McDermott Northwest Mohawks4 (McDermott before 1958) (192?-79, to Southern Ohio)
 Otway Redbirds (192?-58, consolidated into Northwest)
 Rarden Bulldogs (192?-58, consolidated into Northwest)
 South Webster Jeeps5 (192?-79, to Southern Ohio)
 Lucasville Valley Indians3 (192?-79, to Southern Ohio)
 Wheelersburg Pirates1 (192?-79, to Southern Ohio)
 Portsmouth Central Catholic Titans (1938–46, to Southern Ohio Conference)
 Rosemount Clay Panthers5 (1938–79, to Southern Ohio)
 New Boston Glenwood Tigers (1938–46, to Southern Ohio Conference)
 Sciotoville Portsmouth East Tartans (1938–46, to Southern Ohio Conference)
 West Portsmouth Washington Township Senators (1938–46, to Southern Ohio Conference)

 Concurrent with SCL and SOC 1946-79.
 Concurrent with SCL and SOC 1947-58, 1959-79.
 Concurrent with SCL and SOC 1958-79.
 Concurrent with SCL and SOC 1960-79.
 Concurrent with SCL and TCL 1964-79.

South Central Ohio League
Chillicothe Cavaliers (1923–31, 1937–41, 1944–48, 2013–2017)
 Clarksville Clinton-Massie Falcons (2005–2017)
 Lees Creek East Clinton Astros (2012–2017)
 Hillsboro Indians (1923–31, 1937–92, 2003-2017)
 Greenfield McClain Tigers (1923–31, 1937–92, 2003–2017)
 Washington Court House Miami Trace Panthers (1960–92, 2003–2017)
 Washington Court House Washington Blue Lions (1923–31, 1937–92, 2003–2017)
Wilmington Hurricane (1923–31, 1944–92, 2014–2017)
Circleville Tigers (1923–31, 1939–92)
Frankfort Adena Warriors (1924–31)
Franklin Heights Falcons (1958–64)
Pleasant View (now Westland) Panthers (1958–64)
 London Madison-Plains  Golden Eagles (1973–75, 1977–85, 2003–13)
Chillicothe Unioto Sherman Tanks (1974–76)
Ashville Teays Valley Vikings (1977–83)
 London Red Raiders (2003–13)

Southeastern Ohio Athletic League
The SEOAL was Ohio's oldest non-city athletic league, founded in 1925. The 2016-2017 school year was the final year the SEOAL existed as a conference ending a long tenure of historic rivalries. Controversy surrounded Athens and Marietta's exits as no real reason was given but wide speculation was that it was due to them being unable to compete with the other schools on a regular basis. No all-sports trophy was awarded due to only having three members in the final year.
 Jackson Ironmen (1925-2017)
 Logan Chieftains (1925-2017)
 Vincent Warren Warriors (1986-2017)
 The Plains Athens Bulldogs (1925–28, 1931-2008)
 Gallipolis Gallia Academy Blue Devils (1925-2016) 
 Ironton Fighting Tigers (1925–31, 1968–85, 2006–10)
 Nelsonville Greyhounds (1925–67, consolidated into Nelsonville-York)
 Pomeroy Purple Panthers (1925–67, consolidated into Meigs)
 Portsmouth Trojans (1925–28, 2006-2014)
 Wellston Golden Rockets (1925–82)
 New Boston Glenwood Tigers (1927–37)
 Middleport Yellow Jackets (1929–67, consolidated into Meigs)
 Pomeroy Meigs Marauders (1967–83)
 Nelsonville-York Buckeyes (1967–70)
 Waverly Tigers (1970–83)
 Marietta Tigers (1985-2010)
 Bidwell River Valley Raiders (1993-2001)
 Point Pleasant (WV) Big Blacks (1996-2005)
 Chillicothe Cavaliers (2006–13)
 Zanesville Blue Devils (2006–10)

From 2006-10, the SEOAL played in North and South divisions:
 North: Athens (2006–08), Logan, Marietta, Warren, Zanesville
 South: Chillicothe, Gallia, Ironton, Jackson, Portsmouth

Southeastern Ohio Buckeye League
 Belpre Golden Eagles (1946-65, to Tri-Valley Conference 1969)
 Chauncey-Dover Blue Devil's (1946-65, to Athens County League)
  Jacksonville-Trimble Gamecocks (1946-64, consolidated into Glouster)
 McArthur Generals (1946-65, to Mid-Ohio Valley League (Southern)1
 Oak Hill Oaks (1946-49, to Jackson County League)2
 Rutland Red Devils (1946-65, to MOVL)3
 The Plains Indians (1946-65, to ACL)
 Vincent Warren Warriors (1961-65, to TVC 1969)

 Concurrent with Vinton County 1946-65.
 Concurrent with JCL 1946-49.
 Concurrent with Meigs County League 1946-65.

Southern Valley Athletic Conference
Originally the Gallia County League, the conference changed its name to the SVAC in 1958 with an eye on expanding the league to protect against future consolidations. The conference fell apart in 1992 when it was reduced to three schools after four members (Hannan Trace, Kyger Creek, North Gallia, and Southwestern) consolidated into one (River Valley) and Oak Hill left for another league.  Eastern, Southern, and River Valley limped along until those three found conference homes the following year.

 Patriot Cadmus Redskins (192?-65, consolidated into Southwestern)
 Centerville Welshmen (192?-65, consolidated into Southwestern)
 Cheshire Kyger Creek Bobcats (192?-92, Cheshire until 1965, consolidated into River Valley)
 Crown City Hannan Trace Wildcats (192?-92, was Mercerville until 1965, consolidated into River Valley)
 Bidwell North Gallia Pirates (192?-92, Bidwell-Porter until 1965, consolidated into River Valley)
 Rio Grande Bluemen (192?-61, consolidated into Gallia Academy)
 Huntington Vinton Tigers (192?-65, consolidated into North Gallia)
 Coalton Vikings (1954–64, consolidated into Wellston)
 Reedsville Eastern Eagles1 (1961–93, to Tri-Valley Conference)
 Racine Southern Tornadoes1 (1961–93, to Tri-Valley Conference)
 Union Furnace Warriors (1962–73, consolidated into Logan)
 Patriot Southwestern Highlanders (1965–92, consolidated into River Valley)
 Willow Wood Symmes Valley Vikings (1971–77, to Ohio Valley Conference, 1984–91, to Southern Ohio Conference)
 Oak Hill Oaks (1984–92, to Southern Ohio Conference)
 Bidwell River Valley Raiders (1992–93, to Southeastern Ohio Athletic League)

 Concurrent with Meigs County League 1961-67, and Mid-Ohio Valley Conference 1965-69 (for Southern) or 1965-71 (for Eastern).

Tri-County League (Southeast) 
This league started in 1964 with the dissolution of the Pike County League. The two schools not already in other conferences joined with schools from neighboring Adams and Scioto counties that wanted a secondary conference to fill their schedules. These schools largely ended up in the Southern Hills Athletic Conference or the Southern Ohio Conference by the time the league wound up in 1985.

 Portsmouth Clay Panthers1 (1964–85, to Southern Ohio Conference)
 Beaver Eastern Eagles2 (1964–85, to Southern Ohio Conference)
 Franklin Furnace Green Bobcats1 (1964–85, to Southern Ohio Conference)
 Manchester Greyhounds3 (1964–71, to Southern Hills Athletic Conference)
 Peebles Indians3, 4 1964-84, to Southern Hills Athletic Conference)
 South Webster Jeeps1 (1964–85, to Southern Ohio Conference)
 Latham Western Indians (1964–85, to Southern Hills Athletic Conference)

 Played concurrently in TCL and Scioto County League 1964-79, and TCL and SOC 1979-85.
 Played concurrently in TCL and SOC 1981-85.
 Played concurrently in TCL and Adams County League 1964-70.
 Played concurrently in the TCL and SHAC 1971-84.

Tri-State Athletic Conference
 Barboursville (WV) Pirates (1975–80; consolidated into Cabell Midland HS in 1994)
 Ashland (KY) Blazer Tomcats (1975–80)
 Cannonsburg (KY) Boyd County Lions (1975–80)
 Huntington (WV) East Highlanders (1975–80; consolidated into the current Huntington HS in 1996)
 Greenup (KY) Greenup County Musketeers (1975–80)
 Huntington (WV) Pony Express (1975–80; school closed in 1996 and consolidated into the current Huntington High)
 Ironton Tigers (1975–80)
 Portsmouth Trojans (1975–80)
 Russell (KY) Red Devils (1975–80)

Tuscarawas County League
 Baltic Eagles (192?-65, consolidated into Garaway)
 Bolivar Cardinals (192?-56, consolidated into Tuscarawas Valley)
 Dennison Railroaders (192?-60, to Tuscarawas Valley Athletic Conference)
 Dundee Bulldogs (192?-57, consolidated into Garaway)
 Gnadenhutten Indians (192?-68, consolidated into Indian Valley South)
 Midvale Blue Devils (192?-68, consolidated into Indian Valley North)
 Mineral City Tigers (192?-56, consolidated into Tuscarawas Valley)
 Newcomerstown Trojans2 (192?-65, to Scenic Hills Conference and TVAC)
 New Cumberland Eagles (192?-56, consolidated into Tuscarawas Valley)
 Port Washington Purple Riders (192?-68, consolidated into Indian Valley South)
 Ragersville Pirates (192?-39, consolidated into Baltic)
 Stone Creek Pirates (192?-65, consolidated into New Philadelphia)
 Strasburg-Franklin Tigers (192?-68, to Senate)
 Sugarcreek Pirates (192?-57, consolidated into Garaway)
 Tuscarawas Broncos (192?-68, consolidated into Indian Valley North)
 Uhrichsville Tigers (192?-60, to TVAC)
 Winfield Wildcats (192?-34, consolidated into Dover)
 Zoarville Tuscarawas Valley Trojans1 (1956–68, to Senate League)
 Sugarcreek Garaway Pirates1 (1957–68, to Inter-Valley Conference)

 Concurrent with TVAC 1960-68.
 Concurrent with SHC 1964-65.

Tuscarawas Valley Athletic Conference
Formed as some of the Tuscarawas County schools proved to be too large to face sufficient competition in the county league, these schools banded together with other larger schools in the area. The league ended in 1968, as the largest schools joined the dwindling Stark County AA League schools to form the Senate League, and most of the other schools helped found the Inter-Valley Conference.

 Bowerston Conotton Valley Rockets1,2 (1960–68, to Harrison County League)
 Dennison Railroaders (1960–65, consolidated into Claymont)
 Sugarcreek Garaway Pirates3 (1960–68, to Inter-Valley Conference)
 Malvern Hornets1 (1960–68, to Inter-Valley Conference)
 Zoarville Tuscarawas Valley Trojans3 (1960–68, to Senate League)
 Uhrichsville Tigers (1960–65, consolidated into Claymont)
 West Lafayette Generals4 (1960–64, consolidated into Ridgewood)
 West Lafayette Ridgewood Generals5 (1964–68, to Inter-Valley Conference)
 Uhrichsville Claymont Mustangs (1965–68, to Senate League)
 Newcomerstown Trojans5 (1965–68, to Inter-Valley Conference)

 Concurrent with Carroll County League 1960-62.
 Concurrent with HCL 1960-68.
 Concurrent with Tuscarawas County League 1960-68.
 Concurrent with Coshocton County League 1960-64.
 Concurrent with Scenic Hills Conference throughout TVAC membership.

Vinton County League
 Allensville Bombers (192?-66, consolidated into Vinton County)
 Zaleski Brown-Zaleski Panthers (192?-66, consolidated into Vinton County)
 Hamden Engineers (192?-66, consolidated into Vinton County)
 McArthur Generals (192?-66, consolidated into Vinton County)1
 Wilkesville Wilton Jets (192?-66, consolidated into Vinton County)
 Vinton Rural Tigers  (192?-66, consolidated into Vinton County)

 Concurrent with Southeastern Ohio Buckeye League 1946-65, and Mid-Ohio Valley Conference 1965-66.

Washington County League
 Vincent Barlow Bobcats (192?-61, consolidated into Warren)
 Bartlett Indians (192?-61, consolidated into Warren)
 Belpre Golden Eagles (192?-46, to Southeastern Ohio Buckeye League)
 Beverly Bruins (192?-56, consolidated into Fort Frye)
 Lawrence Golden Eagles (192?-64, to Frontier Valley League)
 Lowell Panthers (192?-56, consolidated into Fort Frye)
 New Matamoras Bulldogs (192?-64, to FVL)
 Newport Trojans (192?-64, to FVL)
 Marietta St. Mary's Central Irish (192?-64, to FVL)
 Lower Salem Salem-Liberty Cardinals (192?-64, to FVL)
 Waterford Wildcats (192?-64, to FVL)
 Beverly Fort Frye Cadets (1956-64, to FVL)

See also
Ohio High School Athletic Association
Ohio High School Athletic Conferences
OHSAA East/Southeast Regions athletic conferences

Notes and references